Psalm 107 is the 107th psalm of the Book of Psalms, beginning in English in the King James Version: "O give thanks unto the LORD, for he is good: for his mercy endureth for ever.". The Book of Psalms is part of the third section of the Hebrew Bible, and a book of the Christian Old Testament. In the slightly different numbering system used in the Greek Septuagint and Latin Vulgate translations of the Bible, this psalm is Psalm 106. In Latin, it is known by the incipit, "". It is the first psalm of Book 5 of the Hebrew psalter. Alexander Kirkpatrick notes that this psalm and the previous one, Psalm 106, "are closely connected together", arguing that "the division of the fourth and fifth books does not correspond to any difference of source or character, as is the case in the other books". Psalm 107 is a song of thanksgiving to God, who has been merciful to his people and gathered all who were lost. It is beloved of mariners due to its reference to ships and the sea (v. 23).
 
Psalm 107 is used in both Jewish and Christian liturgies. It has been paraphrased in hymns, and set to music, including George Dyson's Choral Symphony and Mendelssohn's Lobgesang.

Text

King James Version 
 O give thanks unto the LORD, for he is good: for his mercy endureth for ever.
 Let the redeemed of the LORD say so, whom he hath redeemed from the hand of the enemy;
 And gathered them out of the lands, from the east, and from the west, from the north, and from the south.
 They wandered in the wilderness in a solitary way; they found no city to dwell in.
 Hungry and thirsty, their soul fainted in them.
 Then they cried unto the LORD in their trouble, and he delivered them out of their distresses.
 And he led them forth by the right way, that they might go to a city of habitation.
 Oh that men would praise the LORD for his goodness, and for his wonderful works to the children of men!
 For he satisfieth the longing soul, and filleth the hungry soul with goodness.
 Such as sit in darkness and in the shadow of death, being bound in affliction and iron;
 Because they rebelled against the words of God, and contemned the counsel of the most High:
 Therefore he brought down their heart with labour; they fell down, and there was none to help.
 Then they cried unto the LORD in their trouble, and he saved them out of their distresses.
 He brought them out of darkness and the shadow of death, and brake their bands in sunder.
 15 Oh that men would praise the LORD for his goodness, and for his wonderful works to the children of men!
 For he hath broken the gates of brass, and cut the bars of iron in sunder.
 Fools because of their transgression, and because of their iniquities, are afflicted.
 Their soul abhorreth all manner of meat; and they draw near unto the gates of death.
 Then they cry unto the LORD in their trouble, and he saveth them out of their distresses.
 He sent his word, and healed them, and delivered them from their destructions.
 Oh that men would praise the LORD for his goodness, and for his wonderful works to the children of men!
 And let them sacrifice the sacrifices of thanksgiving, and declare his works with rejoicing.
 They that go down to the sea in ships, that do business in great waters;
 These see the works of the LORD, and his wonders in the deep.
 For he commandeth, and raiseth the stormy wind, which lifteth up the waves thereof.
 They mount up to the heaven, they go down again to the depths: their soul is melted because of trouble.
 They reel to and fro, and stagger like a drunken man, and are at their wit's end.
 Then they cry unto the LORD in their trouble, and he bringeth them out of their distresses.
 He maketh the storm a calm, so that the waves thereof are still.
 Then are they glad because they be quiet; so he bringeth them unto their desired haven.
 Oh that men would praise the LORD for his goodness, and for his wonderful works to the children of men!
 Let them exalt him also in the congregation of the people, and praise him in the assembly of the elders.
 He turneth rivers into a wilderness, and the watersprings into dry ground;
 A fruitful land into barrenness, for the wickedness of them that dwell therein.
 He turneth the wilderness into a standing water, and dry ground into watersprings.
 And there he maketh the hungry to dwell, that they may prepare a city for habitation;
 And sow the fields, and plant vineyards, which may yield fruits of increase.
 He blesseth them also, so that they are multiplied greatly; and suffereth not their cattle to decrease.
 Again, they are minished and brought low through oppression, affliction, and sorrow.
 He poureth contempt upon princes, and causeth them to wander in the wilderness, where there is no way.
 Yet setteth he the poor on high from affliction, and maketh him families like a flock.
 The righteous shall see it, and rejoice: and all iniquity shall stop her mouth.
 Whoso is wise, and will observe these things, even they shall understand the lovingkindness of the LORD.

Structure 
Psalm 107 is divided into 43 verses and is one of the longer psalms in the Bible. In the Revised Standard Version (RSV), it is split into seven sections, each section having a related but distinct theme. The first section, the shortest, comprises verses 1–3, a "general introduction"; the second, verses 4–9; the third, verses 10–16; the fourth, verses 17–22; the fifth, verses 23–32; the sixth, verses 33–38; and the seventh and final, verses 39–43. An interesting feature of Psalm 107 commonly found in the poetic books of the Bible is its overall regularity. The line lengths are different, but the size of the original sectional divisions is pleasingly even. The theme of the psalm moves forward from section to section. In the Masoretic Hebrew text, there are seven inverted nuns (׆).

The words Oh, that men would give thanks to the Lord for His goodness, and for His wonderful works to the children of men! appear as a refrain in verses 8, 15, 21 and 31.

Dating 
The Psalms date from anywhere between the 15th - 13th century BC and 400 BC. Although the exact timing of the writing of Psalm 107 is uncertain, it was most likely written during a time of increased union among the Jewish people during the reign of King David (1010-970 BC).

General theme 
Overall, Psalm 107 is considered one of Israel's historical psalms, along with Psalm 106 and many of the royal psalms, among others. The overall outline of the historical psalms is to tell a story of a God who accomplishes "wonderful works" (verse 8), although the Israelites, His chosen people, have proved faithless. In the psalmist's assessment, acts of infidelity often seem to correspond to an eventual awe-inspiring work of mercy from the Lord. The psalm also includes several more specific themes which emphasize the general tone of praise and thanksgiving for the God of Israel.

Directional theme 
In the introduction, the first section of Psalm 107, the Lord is said to gather “the redeemed ... from the east and from the west, from the north and from the south” (v. 2, 3). Following this, the next four sections address individuals who “wandered in desert wastes”, “sat in darkness and gloom”, “were sick through their sinful ways”, and “went down to the sea in ships” (v. 4, 10, 17, 23). Each of these locational descriptors corresponds to a cardinal direction as mentioned in the third verse of the psalm. The desert wastes mentioned in the second section of the psalm seem to indicate a “great, eastern desert” that might be beat down upon by the sun, which rises in the east.    Likewise, in the opposing, western direction, where the sun sets, the Israelites are said to sit “in darkness and gloom” (v. 10). The correlation depicted in this section between darkness and helplessness - apart from the aid of the Lord - harkens back to Old Testament descriptions of Abraham (Genesis 15:12). Throughout early Hebrew history, north was thought to be the direction most associated with evil and iniquity, thus adding emphasis to the direction of north's correspondence to the fourth stanza, beginning with “some were sick through their sinful ways, and because of their iniquities suffered affliction” (v. 17). And finally, in the orientation of the region that Israel occupied at the time of Psalm 107, to the south lay the sea, directly paralleling the beginning of the fifth section, “some went down to the sea in ships” (v. 23).

Message 
Psalm 107 is, above all, a hymn commemorating the power of God. Despite the transgressions of the Israelites, the Lord forgives them. The psalm elaborates on this theme, going on to say that the Lord "turns a desert into pools of water ... and there he lets the hungry dwell" (v. 35, 36). This description of miracles as performed by the Lord reinforces the imagery of "wonderful works" mentioned earlier in the psalm (v. 8). The works of the Lord, however, are mentioned in many psalms; what makes Psalm 107 somewhat unusual is its depiction of the works of the Lord as explication for the people. The psalm is a hymn of thanksgiving to the Lord “for the purpose of making [the Lord’s works] known to humankind, so that they too can join in the praise of [the Lord]”. This concept seems to indicate that David has written a sort of circulatory hymn thanking the Lord for enabling the Israelites to thank the Lord. These concordant themes of enlightenment and gratitude reinforce each other throughout the psalm, and, indeed, throughout the rest of the fifth book of psalms, of which Psalm 107 is the opening hymn.

Kirkpatrick argues that "the men" called upon to rejoice by verses 8, 15, 21 and 31 are not people in general but specifically those whose deliverance has previously been described (those who "wandered in the wilderness in a desolate way", verse 4, etc.)

Relevance in the New Testament 
As with much of the Old Testament, many Christians understand Psalm 107 to foreshadow an event recorded in the New Testament. A famous account of the life of Christ from chapter four of Mark's Gospel follows the fifth section of Psalm 107, which describes the plight and eventual rescue of those on the sea. In Mark's biography of Jesus, while he and his disciples are on Lake Galilee in a boat, a storm swells. Jesus calms the storm by saying, “Peace! Be still!”. In the same way, Psalm 107 describes the Israelites at sea when a storm arises. The waves “mounted up to heaven, they went down to the depths”, (v. 26) and the Lord then “makes still” (v. 29) the storm. The language of both passages is similar, supporting the mirrored imagery and situation that the stories share. The divine being who calms the storm is also the same according to the Christian tradition: the Lord, whether Father, Son, or Holy Spirit, is one being. Verse 10 is quoted in Luke

Significance in tradition 
Psalm 107 forms the opening piece of the modern liturgy for Israel Independence Day found in Religious-Zionist Jewish prayer books. It is also used within the Roman Catholic faith as a part of the Mass. In the Roman Catholic Mass, selections from Psalm 107 are read on various occasions throughout the year, with the most common occurrence being during the hymn between the first and second readings. It is often quoted at events involving the navy and seafarers, such as the launching of ships.

Musical settings 
Verse 1 of Psalm 107 is the text for a round in German, "Danket, danket dem Herrn",  with traditional music from the 18th century. The psalm inspired William Whiting's hymn "Eternal Father, Strong to Save".

George Dyson chose verses from the psalm as the text for his Choral Symphony, "Psalm CVII". Verses were used as the text of movement 3 of Mendelssohn's Lobgesang.

References

External links 

 
 
 Text of Psalm 107 according to the 1928 Psalter
 Psalms Chapter 107 text in Hebrew and English, mechon-mamre.org
 Bless the LORD, my soul; all my being, bless his holy name! United States Conference of Catholic Bishops
 Psalm 107:1 introduction and text, biblestudytools.com
 Psalm 107 – Learning from God’s Deliverance to Returning Captives enduringword.com
 Psalm 107 / O give thanks to the Lord, for he is gracious, for his steadfast love endures for ever. Church of England
 Psalm 107 at biblegateway.com
 Hymns for Psalm 107 hymnary.org

107